Rembrandt's J'Accuse is a 2008 Dutch, German and Finnish documentary film directed by Peter Greenaway about criticism of today's visual illiteracy argued by means of a forensic search of Rembrandt's 1642 painting The Night Watch. Greenaway explains the conspiracy about a murder and the motives of all its characters who have conspired to kill for their combined self-advantage.

The film is considered a companion piece, since it came out a year after Greenaway's Nightwatching, a narrative film about Rembrandt featuring most of the same actors and sets.

References

External links 
 

2008 films
Dutch documentary films
Documentary films about painters
Films directed by Peter Greenaway
Finnish documentary films
2008 independent films
2008 documentary films
Works about Rembrandt
2000s English-language films
2000s British films